Karawata is a genus of flowering plant in the family Bromeliaceae, native to eastern Brazil. The genus was first described in 2019.

Species
, Plants of the World Online accepted the following species:
Karawata depressa (L.B.Sm.) J.R.Maciel & G.M.Sousa, syn. Aechmea depressa L.B.Sm
Karawata gustavoi (J.A.Siqueira & Leme) J.R.Maciel & G.M.Sousa, syn. Aechmea gustavoi J.A.Siqueira & Leme
Karawata hostilis (E.Pereira) J.R.Maciel & G.M.Sousa, syn. Aechmea hostilis E.Pereira
Karawata multiflora (L.B.Sm.) J.R.Maciel & G.M.Sousa, syn. Aechmea multiflora L.B.Sm.
Karawata nigribracteata (J.R.Maciel, Louzada & M.Alves) J.R.Maciel & G.M.Sousa, syn. Aechmea nigribracteata J.R.Maciel, Louzada & M.Alves
Karawata prasinata (G.M.Sousa & Wand.) J.R.Maciel & G.M.Sousa, syn. Aechmea prasinata G.M.Sousa & Wand.
Karawata saxicola (L.B.Sm.) J.R.Maciel & G.M.Sousa, syn. Aechmea saxicola L.B.Sm.

References

Bromelioideae
Bromeliaceae genera